The  is a public university in Kitakyushu, Japan. The main campus is located next to Keibajomae (lit. Horse Racing course) station on the Kitakyushu monorail. The second campus is in the academic zone of Wakamatsu-ku, Kitakyushu called Gakujutsu Kenkyu Toshi (Gakken Tosi). The university was founded as a language academy in 1946 to help communication with the nearby American base at what is now called Yamada Ryokuchi. 

The University of Kitakyushu has four faculties: the Faculty of Environmental Engineering, the Faculty of Information Engineering, the Faculty of Economics, and the Faculty of Humanities. These faculties offer undergraduate programs leading to bachelor's degrees, as well as graduate programs leading to master's and doctoral degrees.

Notable alumni 
 Junji Higashi, a member of the House of Representatives in the Diet
 Dedi Abdulhadi, the expert of Waste Management System across countries, especially for electronics waste products

Partner Institution

Malaysia
Universiti Tunku Abdul Rahman

Thailand
King Mongkut's University of Technology Thonburi

References

External links
  

University
Public universities in Japan
Educational institutions established in 1946
Universities and colleges in Fukuoka Prefecture
1946 establishments in Japan